The Lancia Kappa or Lancia k (Type 838) is an executive car manufactured and marketed by Italian manufacturer Lancia from 1994–2000, with saloon, estate, and coupé variants — sharing platforms with the Alfa Romeo 166. The Kappa has a front-engine, front-drive, five passenger, left-hand drive design.

After its debut at the 1994 Paris Auto Show, production reached 117,216, over six years. The Kappa was manufactured at the Fiat factory in Tetti Francesi, Rivalta di Torino and was designed by the Lancia Style Center in collaboration with the I.DE.A Institute.

Lancia had earlier used the Kappa nameplate for the 1919 Kappa, with evolutions called Dikappa and Trikappa).

Overview

Kappa is the tenth letter of the Greek alphabet, Lancia having frequently used the Greek letters for its model nameplates.  In writing, Lancia often referred to the Kappa simply as the k (lower case "k"), which is fairly similar to the original Greek letter κ.

In Poland, where Fiat Auto is the largest domestic car manufacturer, the Kappa served as official government cars (replacing Themas).

Autocar's Peter Robinson reviewed the Kappa in November 1994. He commented on the car's bland styling which was justified by Fiat's Paolo Cantarella on the basis that the designers did not want to create too much "visual noise." The body was reported as having twice the torsional rigidity of the outgoing Thema, and was 15 percent stiffer than any of its rivals. The automatic Aisin-Warner gearbox (50-40 LE type) was shared with the Volvo 850. Robinson went on to say "the Kappa´s dimensions ensure a commodious interior, the impression of space only heightened by a low cowl and very Japanese-looking fascia, somewhere between a Honda NSX and Lexus LS400." Rear cabin room was described as "immense" but the cushion was criticised for being too flat, a fault rectified in later iterations of the car. Robinson criticised the "horrid mock wood with which Lancia frames the prominent central console that runs from the handbrake, up the full length of the dash and over the top." About the driving characteristics, Robinson wrote: "If Lancia quietened the starter motor, this would be one refined drivetrain...with no hint of any 5-cylinder unevenness." The 2.4 litre engine tested appeared to have been tuned for low-end torque, a characteristic of this Alpine brand. The engine was praised by Robinson for its "smooth responsiveness" and "torque steer has been eliminated...and the Servotronic steering is terrific, with just the right degree of self-centering." His summary of ride and handling was that car was better than average but not class-leading: "On the Lancia there is too much body roll and the front grip in the wet didn't inspire confidence."

Model history
 1994 - Kappa production begins.
 1996 - An estate car joins the lineup. The naturally aspirated 2.0-litre gasoline engine is fitted with a variable geometry inlet manifold. Inside the cabin, the seats are replaced by a new design, including new upholstery patterns.
 1997 - The coupé is launched, while at the same time, some changes are made to the interior, trunk, suspension and engine bay, as well as new alloy wheels.
 1998 - The 2.0 L turbocharged four-cylinder engine gets replaced by the five-cylinder, while the turbodiesel was upgraded to a JTD engine. The bumper guards, previously black, are changed to body-coloured, and the base trim level, LE, is dropped, leaving only the more lavish LS and LX. At the same time, a special trim level is introduced for the turbocharged gasoline engine, called simply the "Turbo", distinguished by the lack of chrome decals around the window frames. The interior materials are also upgraded across the lineup, including the addition of a leather-wrapped steering wheel with a different design and front central armrest.
 1999 - The other two five-cylinder engines are modified along with the air conditioning unit.
 2000 - The Kappa gains xenon HID headlamps. Production ceased in mid-2000 (Coupé's earlier in the year).

Kappa SW and Coupé

The station wagon version of the Kappa, designated "SW" by Lancia, was designed and built by Pininfarina and did not differ from the saloon exterior dimensions, sharing most of its body panels. Only 9,208 cars were built in Pininfarina's factory. This estate version was also available with Boge-Nivomat self-levelling hydropneumatic rear suspension.

The Coupé was designed by Centro Stile Lancia and built by Maggiora and technically quite different from the saloon, having a shorter wheelbase (by 120 mm), wider rear track and a distinctive profile with frameless doors. The front, from bumper to the window screen, was identical to the other Kappas. It was Lancia's first coupé since 1984, when the Beta and Gamma coupés were discontinued, and remains the last Lancia to feature this body style to this day. The small building capacities at the Maggiora factory for this essentially hand-made car,  and the relatively high price, destined it to be a rare vehicle. As a money saver the rear lights came from Delta. Only 3263 coupes were manufactured from 1996 to 2000, making this model a true rarity. Car magazine described the car as looking "top heavy, like a Bentley Continental that's been heated up and squeezed at both ends." However, the car's engine range was praised for matching the vehicle's dynamics, the 2.4 litre five cylinder and the 3.0 Alfa-derived V6 coming closest to "infusing the k Coupe with the classy character its styling tries to suggest."  "It's the spiky turbo four that asks the hardest questions of the chassis and the all-strut suspension doesn't flounder. It shines. A viscous coupling helps the front wheels cope with the onslaught of the engine's old school, big-bang turbo delivery, and it feels remarkably untroubled." About the refinement and ride, John Barker (of Car Magazine) reported that the occupants "are completely isolated from any vibration while the ride is smooth at moderate speeds, parrying bumps quietly and unobtrusively."  The interior was described as "appealing" and having "curvy, attractive door casings, plump supportive Recaro seats and choice plastics.". The 1997 price was estimated at 24,000 pounds sterling.

Engines
The Kappa had engines fitted transversely, all powering only the front wheels. They were available with either a five-speed manual or four-speed automatic transmission, unless otherwise indicated.

2.0 20V
 uprated to 155 hp in 1996, thanks to the addition of a variable geometry inlet manifold, called the Variable Intake System (V.I.S) by Lancia.
 modified again in 1999.
 there were two versions of the manual transmission available for this engine, called Power Drive and Comfort Drive, with gear ratios optimized towards the former or the latter, respectively. Optional 4-speed automatic AISIN AW 596 could be chosen, later replaced by AW 30510.
 this engine was not available in the Coupé

2.4 20V
 fitted with V.I.S
 from 1998 available with 4-speed automatic AISIN AW 30510.
 slightly modified in 1999

3.0 V6 24V

 not fitted with V.I.S
 slightly modified in 1999
 Available with 5-speed manual transmission or 4-speed automatic Z.F. 4HP-18EH or from 1998 with Z.F. 4HP20. The latter marketed as sequential, adaptive automatic called 'Comfortronic', with manual operation.

2.0 16V Turbo

 superseded by the 5-cylinder turbo in 1998
 5-speed manual transmission only

2.0 20V Turbo
 superseded the 4-cylinder turbo in 1998
 5-speed manual transmission only

2.4 TDs/JTD
 originally a distributor-pump turbodiesel refitted with common rail in 1998 and thereafter referred to as a JTD engine
 not available with automatic transmission or in the Coupé

manual is 5-speed, automatic/comfortronic is 4-speed

Concept cars and specials

Lancia Kayak
The Lancia Kayak or Bertone Kayak was a 4-seater coupé concept car by Italian coachbuilder Bertone based on Lancia Kappa mechanicals, unveiled at the 1995 Geneva Motor Show.

Kappa Limousine
A one-off Kappa Limousine with extended middle section, and wheelbase, was built for Gianni Agnelli. Its concept was very similar to the Thema Limousine from 1987. The car was finished in dark blue with a matte-black roof.

References

External links

 Lancisti.net—An information exchange and support community for Lancia owners and enthusiasts

Kappa
Executive cars
Sedans
Station wagons
Coupés
Front-wheel-drive vehicles
2000s cars
Cars introduced in 1994
Flagship vehicles